The Capital Beltway is a beltway surrounding Harrisburg, Pennsylvania, in the United States.  It is co-designated as Interstate 81 (I-81), I-83, U.S. Route 11 (US 11), US 322, and Pennsylvania Route 581 (PA 581) at various locations along the route. The beltway is primarily located in the suburbs of Harrisburg on both sides of the Susquehanna River; however, part of its southern leg passes along the southern edge of downtown.  The southern section of the highway is named the Harrisburg Expressway.  Officially designated in 1997, the Beltway is an assemblage of several freeways built over the preceding 45 years.

Route description

Continuing on I-83, the beltway parallels Paxton Street (formerly US 322), passing the Harrisburg Mall as the road approaches the Eisenhower Interchange.  At the junction, the Capital Beltway continues on I-83 as it turns north, while beginning a concurrency with US 322.  Continuing for three miles (5 km), I-83 ends at I-81 at an interchange locally known as the "81/83 split".  US 322 and the Capital Beltway continue on I-81 south.

On I-81, US 322 exits off I-81 at exit 67B, heading in a northerly direction to State College, beginning a concurrency with US 22 west. Exit 67A is for US 22 east, Cameron Street, which is where the Pennsylvania Farm Show Complex & Expo Center is located (a half mile south of the beltway).  The Capital Beltway crosses the Susquehanna the second time on the George N. Wade Memorial Bridge.  The beltway makes a southerly turn just beyond the bridge, near the western end of the Susquehanna Water Gap of Blue Mountain.

Continuing on I-81 until exit 59, the Capital Beltway exits south onto PA 581.  US 11 begins a concurrency with PA 581 starting at exit 3; at exit 5A it exits off and starts a concurrency with US 15 in the borough of Camp Hill.  The beltway continues east for two miles (3 km) until it completes the loop by reaching I-83 at the York split.

History

The Capital Beltway was officially designated in 1997, an assemblage of several freeways built over the preceding forty-five years. The earliest parts are its eastern and southern sections. The segment between US 22 in Colonial Park and US 422 on the site of the future Eisenhower Interchange opened in 1954, designated initially as part of Bypass US 230 (PA 230 after 1961).  In 1960-61, I-83, the Baltimore-Harrisburg expressway, was extended east from Lemoyne, over the John Harris Bridge to Paxton St. in south Harrisburg. Also opened was a 4.5 mile freeway west from I-83 in Lemoyne to connect with US 15 in Camp Hill and US 11 in Hampden Township, where those highways were entering what was then the western edge of the metropolitan area.  The new east-west freeway was called the Harrisburg Expressway. (Upon its opening, US 11 was rerouted to follow the Expressway from the Hampden terminus to Camp Hill, and thence up 32nd St to Market St. where it rejoined its old path. In 1992, the whole segment of the Expressway west of the York Split in Lemoyne was designated PA 581.) 

In 1968-71, I-83 was extended from Paxton Street east and north via the new Eisenhower Interchange.  PA 230 to Colonial Park was redesignated I-83 and extended a mile further north to link with the new, temporary, southern terminus of I-81.  In 1971-75, I-81 was built between Colonial Park and Carlisle, its final section in Pennsylvania to be completed. But I-81 on the west shore had no convenient connections with the Harrisburg Expressway which ran parallel five miles to its south. Indeed, for years the edge of the Harrisburg area inset on Pennsylvania highway maps ran no further west than Camp Hill and Enola, showing US 11-15 as the primary north–south route between the two highways on the west shore.

Not until 1995 did work begin on the 3-mile section of PA 581 between the Harrisburg Expressway terminus and I-81 in the Good Hope area of Hampden Township. Engineering for the project was provided by Gannett Fleming and McCormick Taylor of Camp Hill.  When it was opened for public use in 1997, the Capital Beltway designation was assigned to all its current components.

On May 9, 2013, a tanker crashed and caught fire at the interchange between I-81 and US 22/US 322 in Harrisburg. The fire damaged the bridges carrying westbound US 22/US 322 and a ramp over I-81. At least one of those bridges, carrying US 22 eastbound over I-81 and several ramps, and possibly another, the ramp carrying traffic from I-81 northbound to US 22/US 322 westbound, will have to be demolished and replaced. The fire resulted in about ten miles of I-81, from the PA 581 interchange to the I-83 interchange, being closed in both directions, with traffic being diverted along the southern portion of the Capital Beltway.

Exit list
Mileposts follow individual component highways.

See also

Capital Beltway, in the Washington, D.C. metropolitan area

References

External links

Pennsylvania Highways: PA 581

Beltways in the United States
Capital Beltway
Harrisburg, Pennsylvania
Interstate 83
Interstate 81
Transportation in Cumberland County, Pennsylvania
Transportation in Dauphin County, Pennsylvania
Streets in Harrisburg, Pennsylvania